Thrips paradoxa is a species of common thrip in the family Thripidae.

References

Further reading

 
 
 
 
 
 

Thrips
Articles created by Qbugbot
Insects described in 1758
Taxa named by Carl Linnaeus